Strigatella luctuosa is a species of sea snail, a marine gastropod mollusk in the family Mitridae, the miters or miter snails.

Description
The shell size varies between 16 mm and 35 mm.

Distribution
This species is distributed in the Indian Ocean along Aldabra, the Mascarene Basin, Mozambique, Transkei (RFA) and in the Pacific Ocean along the Philippines, Papua New Guinea and Australia.

References

 Cernohorsky W. O. (1976). The Mitrinae of the World. Indo-Pacific Mollusca 3(17) page(s): 443
 Drivas, J. & M. Jay (1988). Coquillages de La Réunion et de l'île Maurice

Mitridae
Gastropods described in 1813